The 1947 Brooklyn Dodgers season was their second in the All-America Football Conference. The team matched their previous output of 3-10-1. They failed to qualify for the playoffs for the second consecutive season.

The team's statistical leaders included Bob Hoernschemeyer with 783 passing yards and 702 rushing yards, Saxon Judd with 204 receiving yards, and Mickey Colmer with 60 points scored.

Season schedule

Division standings

References

Brooklyn Dodgers (AAFC) seasons
Brooklyn Dodgers
Brooklyn Dodgers (AAFC) season
1940s in Brooklyn
Flatbush, Brooklyn